Andrei Mahu (born 3 September 1991) is a Moldovan rugby union player. His usual position is as a Lock and he currently plays for USA Perpignan in top 14.

In 2014–15 Pro12 season he played for Zebre.  In 2020-2021 season he played for London Irish.
 
From 2011 to 2017 Mahu was named in the Moldova squad.

In October 2020 it was confirmed he would move to English Premiership Rugby side London Irish ahead of the 2020–21 season.

References

External links 
It's Rugby English Profile
Ultimate Rugby Profile
All Rugby Profile

Moldovan expatriate rugby union players
Moldovan rugby union players
1991 births
Living people
Rugby union locks
Moldovan expatriate sportspeople in Italy
Moldovan expatriate sportspeople in France
Moldovan expatriate sportspeople in Romania
Zebre Parma players
London Irish players